Dimmit County is a county located in the U.S. state of Texas. As of the 2020 census, its population was 8,615. The county seat is Carrizo Springs. The county was founded in 1858 and later organized in 1880. It is named after Philip Dimmitt, a major figure in the Texas Revolution. The spelling of the county name and the individual's name differ because of a spelling error in the bill creating the county name.

History

Native Americans

Paleo-Indians artifacts indicate these people lived in Dimmit County as far back as 9200 BC.
The archaic period (6000 BC to AD 1000) up to the arrival of the Spanish brought increased hunter-gatherers to the area. These Indians subsisted mostly on game, wild fruits, seeds, and roots. They carved tools from wood and stone, wove baskets, and sewed rabbitskin robes. They also made pottery and hunted with bows and arrows. Their most effective weapon was the atlatl, a throwing stick that greatly increased the deadliness of their spears. Coahuiltecan Indians native to now-Dimmit County were later squeezed out by Apache and Comanche. Hostile tribes harassed settlers, forcing some to pull up stakes.  Texas Rangers and local volunteers, as well as disease, ran the Indians out of the county by 1877.

The Wild Horse Desert 
The area between the Rio Grande and the Nueces River, which included the county, became disputed territory known as the Wild Horse Desert, where neither the Republic of Texas nor the Mexican government had clear control. Ownership was in dispute until the Mexican–American War. The area became filled with lawless characters, who deterred settlers in the area. An agreement signed between Mexico and the United States in the 1930s put the liability of payments to the descendants of the original land grants on Mexico.

County established and settlements

Dimmit County was officially established in 1858 from parts of Bexar, Webb, Maverick, and Uvalde Counties. The county was organized in 1880. Carrizo Springs became the county seat.

Early settlers found Dimmit County to be an abundant grassland with mesquite, oak, and ash trees and wildlife that included buffalo, deer, turkeys, feral horses (mustangs), panthers, and javelinas. Artesian springs, bubbling up from a vast reservoir of underground water, fed into running streams that harbored giant catfish, crawfish, and mussels. Explorers found the area a good place to hunt mustangs, and to feed and water cattle.

Pioneering cattleman Levi English settled Carrizo Springs in 1865 with a group of 15 families from Atascosa County. Within two years, they were joined by a second group of settlers from Goliad County. Early dwellings were crude adobe structures or dugouts.  In 1880, Levi English donated land for a county courthouse, schools, and churches in the town.

Lawlessness, banditry, and in particular, cattle rustling from both sides of the Mexican border, pervaded until the 1880s. Marshal J. King Fisher, managed to bring about a reduction in the lawlessness. King also staunchly enforced the "dry county" law once the residents voted to outlaw the sale of alcohol.

Dimmit County's first producing oil well was drilled in 1943. In 1980, Dimmit County farmers earned about $20 million for their crops, while about $60 million in oil and gas were produced.

Formation of the 1914 White Man's Primary Association was designed to exclude Mexican Americans from any meaningful participation in county politics. In the 1944 Smith v. Allwright case, the United States Supreme Court found the White Primary to be unconstitutional.

Water
D.C. Frazier drilled the first artesian well, which produced gallons of water a minute, near Carrizo Springs in 1884. By 1900, about 25 artesian wells were flowing in the Carrizo Springs area, but most of the water was wasted, and very little was used for irrigation. Colonel J.S. Taylor introduced large-scale Bermuda onion and strawberry farming to the area, and was the first to use irrigation on a large scale in Dimmit County. In 1899, Taylor built a 30 ft dam across the Nueces River to irrigate  of farmland. He also drilled a deep artesian well. By 1910, Taylor's methods were being imitated by a number of other developers and vegetable farmers. Irrigation helped make Dimmit County part of the Texas Winter Garden region.
By the 1920s, however, artesian water began to dry up. The necessity of installing expensive pumps drove many farmers out of business. By 1934, the United States Department of the Interior concluded that the existing water supply would not support substantial additional development. Much of the land reverted to rangeland.

Oil

The Big Wells oil field, east of Big Wells, was discovered in 1969.  The field produces from the Cretaceous San Miguel Formation sandstone underlying the Olmos Formation sandstone.  The field extends north into Zavala.

The Eagle Ford oil field was reported to be under development in 2011, with 3,000 wells projected to extract oil by hydraulic fracturing from tight shale formations. The oil play has improved business activity in the county, but raised fears regarding the adequacy of water supplies, as fracking requires injection of large quantities of water under pressure into wells to break surrounding rock.

Geography

Major highways
  U.S. Highway 83
  U.S. Highway 277
  State Highway 85

Adjacent counties
 Zavala County (north)
 Frio County (northeast)
 La Salle County (east)
 Webb County (south)
 Maverick County (west)

Demographics

As of the 2020 United States census, there were 8,615 people, 3,178 households, and 2,427 families residing in the county.

As of the census of 2000, 10,248 people, 3,308 households, and 2,646 families were residing in the county.  The population density was 8 people per square mile (3/km2).  The 4,112 housing units averaged 3 per mi2 (1/km2).  The racial makeup of the county was 76.95% White, 0.88% African American, 0.70% Native American, 0.66% Asian,  18.3% from other races, and 2.51% from two or more races. About 84.97% of the population were Hispanic or Latino of any race.

Of the 3,308 households,  42.0% had children under 18 living with them, 57.4% were married couples living together, 17.2% had a female householder with no husband present, and 20.0% were not families. About 18.0% of all households were made up of individuals, and 9.30% had someone living alone who was 65 age or older.  The average household size was 3.06, and the average family size was 3.48.

In the county, the age distribution was 33.2% under 18, 8.8% from 18 to 24, 24.70% from 25 to 44, 20.7% from 45 to 64, and 12.6% who were 65 or older.  The median age was 32 years.  For every 100 females, there were 94.30 males.  For every 100 females age 18 and over, there were 91.10 males.

The median income for a household in the county was $21,917, and for a family was $24,579. Males had a median income of $25,000 versus $15,370 for females. The per capita income for the county was $9,765. About 33.20% of the population and 29.70% of families were below the poverty line.  Of the total population, 40.30% of those under the age of 18 and 31.50% of those 65 and older were living below the poverty line. The county's per capita income makes it one of the poorest counties in the United States.

Politics 
Like most of heavily Hispanic South Texas, Dimmit is heavily Democratic. While the state of Texas went strongly for Republican George W. Bush in the 2004 presidential election, Dimmit County was a traditional stronghold of the Democratic Party, supporting U.S. Senator John F. Kerry of Massachusetts, with 2,365 votes for Kerry to 1,188 for Bush.  The last Republican to win a majority in Dimmit County was Richard Nixon in 1972. In 1892, Dimmit County gave all its few votes to Populist James B. Weaver, thus making it his leading county.

Education

All of Dimmit County is served by the Carrizo Springs Independent School District.

Asherton Independent School District closed in 1999 and joined Carrizo Springs ISD.

The designated community college is Southwest Texas Junior College.

Communities

Cities 
 Asherton
 Big Wells
 Carrizo Springs (county seat)

Census-designated places 
 Brundage
 Carrizo Hill
 Catarina

See also

 Asher and Mary Isabelle Richardson House
 National Register of Historic Places listings in Dimmit County, Texas
 Recorded Texas Historic Landmarks in Dimmit County
 Winter Garden Region

References

External links

 Dimmit County in Handbook of Texas Online at the University of Texas
 Read Philip Dimmit's entry in the Biographical Encyclopedia of Texas hosted by the Portal to Texas History.
 Historic Dimmit County materials, hosted by the Portal to Texas History.
 Dimmit County History at HistoricTexas.net
 Dimmit County Profile by the Texas Association of Counties 

 
1880 establishments in Texas
Populated places established in 1880
Majority-minority counties in Texas
Hispanic and Latino American culture in Texas